2-Ethoxyethanol, also known by the trademark Cellosolve or ethyl cellosolve, is a solvent used widely in commercial and industrial applications. It is a clear, colorless, nearly odorless liquid that is miscible with water, ethanol, diethyl ether, acetone, and ethyl acetate.

2-Ethoxyethanol is manufactured by the reaction of ethylene oxide with ethanol.

As with other glycol ethers, 2-ethoxyethanol has the useful property of being able to dissolve chemically diverse compounds.  It will dissolve oils, resins, grease, waxes, nitrocellulose, and lacquers. This is an ideal property as a multi-purpose cleaner, and, therefore, 2-ethoxyethanol is used in products such as varnish removers and degreasing solutions.

References

External links

CDC - NIOSH Pocket Guide to Chemical Hazards

Primary alcohols
Glycol ethers